Christophe Gamard, Gamar or Gamart, was a 17th-century French architect, who worked in Paris and died there in 1649.

Biography 
He was a master mason in 1613, an architect of the old Saint-Sulpice in 1623 (and began its reconstruction after 1643), and a city juror (juré de la Ville) in 1626. He was an assistant of Claude Vellefaux, the supervising architect (architecte voyer) of the Abbey of Saint-Germain-des-Prés, and succeeded him in that position in 1627. He became an architect of the king (architecte du roi) in 1639.

Family 
He married Claude Vellefaux's daughter, Étiennette Vellefaux. They had two sons, Christophe and Hubert. Widowed, he married Marie Gillier in 1648, despite the opposition of his sons.

Works 
 The enlargement of the nave of the former Saint-Sulpice church by adding side chapels, between 1614 and 1631
 The Pont au Double, between 1626 and 1631, on the small arm of the Seine to connect the buildings of the Hôtel-Dieu located on the île de la Cité with those on the left bank. He succeeded his father-in-law as architect of the Hôtel-Dieu de Paris and created the Rosary Room and the great portal of the rue de la Bûcherie, between 1626 and 1635
 The Prison de l'Abbaye, dependence of justice of the abbot of Saint-Germain-des-Prés, built between 1631 and 1635.
 The Hospice des Incurables (now the ), between 1633 and 1640, at the request of Cardinal de La Rochefoucauld and Marguerite de Rouillé. He was the architect of the hospice until his death.
 The fountain on the parvis, located approximately 20 m from the north portal of the Cathédrale Notre-Dame de Paris, between 1636 and 1639
 The  after 1632
 Houses on the north side of rue Sainte-Marguerite (currently ), in 1635
 The south side portal, Sainte-Marguerite portal, the rib vaults, the high capitals of the central vessel of the abbey Church of Saint-Germain-des-Prés, between 1646 and 1649
 The new church of Saint-Sulpice for which he provided the plans in 1636, and, after their approval in 1645, began construction by the Chapel of the Virgin in 1646 and continued it until his death

References

Bibliography 
 Jean-Marie Pérouse de Montclos (dir.), Le Guide du patrimoine de Paris, Paris, Hachette, 1995, .
 Bernard Oudin, Dictionnaire des architectes, Paris, Seghers, (2nd edition), 1994, .

External links 
 Notice on Structurae

17th-century French architects
1649 deaths
Year of birth missing
Place of birth missing